Kosta Bajić (Serbian Cyrillic: Коста Бајић; born 7 September 1989, in Novi Sad) is a Serbian football striker who plays for Bratstvo Gračanica in the First League of the Federation of Bosnia and Herzegovina.

Club career

Early career
He passed through all categories of Vojvodina. Later, he played for the lower-ranked clubs, where he was a very effective. In summer of 2013, he signed for Jagodina, together with Aleksandar Pešić. He debut for Jagodina in last fixture of half-season Jelen SuperLiga versus Radnički Kragujevac. Coach gave a chance to him in last minutes.

Besëlidhja Lezhë
In January 2015, Bajić was transferred in Albania, signing a contract until the end of the season with Albanian First Division side Besëlidhja Lezhë. He was allocated squad number 9 and made his competitive debut with the club on 7 February in a goalless draw against Tërbuni Pukë. He endured a 292-minute scoreless run before scoring the first goal in his fourth appearance on 4 March, where he netted the second of the 2–0 home win against Iliria Fushë-Krujë.

However that goal was to open the floodgates of the strikers scoring in Albanian First Division, including three strikers in April against Besa Kavajë, Kamza, and Iliria Fushë-Krujë. On 2 May, Bajić scored the quickest goal in Albanian First Division history, finding the net after just 36 seconds to help the team to beat Adriatiku Mamurras 1–0 in the matchday 25.

In the penultimate week of the season Bajić scored a brace in a 5–0 home win against Veleçiku Koplik, and finished the second part of the season with 7 goal in 13 appearances. The team finished second in the Group A, failing to secure a spot in Albanian Superliga next season.

Following the end of the season, Bajić agreed a contract extension, signing until June 2016. He started his second season with the club on strong fashion, scoring a hat-trick in matchday 3 against Besa Kavajë for a 4–0 home win, helping the team to take the lead of the league. He enjoyed a prolific form in the first months of the season, scoring the winner against the rivals of Kastrioti Krujë for a 2–1 win in the returning leg of 2015–16 Albanian Cup first round, as the team were eliminated by away goal rule, losing the first match 1–0. Back in league, Bajić scored two more in a 4–0 triumph against Adriatiku Mamurras, taking his tally up to 5 goals.

He started the 2016 in style, scoring a hat-trick in a 4–0 home win against Kazma in the matchday 15. In March, Bajić scored two braces in the 4–0 victories against Ada Velipojë on 6th and 19th. In the penultimate week of the season, Bajić made history by scoring all six goals of his team in a 6–7 home defeat to Adriatiku Mamurras, taking his tally up to 23 goals. With 23 league goals, Bajić clinched the Golden Boot as the league top goalscorer, scoring one more than Erzeni Shijak's Ermir Rezi. Besëlidhja Lezhë once again failed to secure a spot in Albanian Superliga for the next season.

Bajić kicked off his third Besëlidhja Lezhë season on 24 September 2016 by playing full-90 minutes in a 0–1 win at Besa Kavajë. He also played in the two-legged tie against Erzeni valid for the first round of Albanian Cup, scoring in the second leg to help Besëlidhja progress to the next round with the aggregate 5–3. He netted his first league strike of the season on 12 October in the 2–3 win against Erzeni, scoring the third of the match. Ten days later, Bajić was again on target, scoring the lone goal in the last moments of the match against Kastrioti Krujë, lifting his team in the second position.

Career statistics

Honours
Albanian First Division Top Goalscorer: 2015–16 season (23 goals)

References

External links
 Stats at utakmica.rs
 Kosta Bajić at jelenfootball.com
 
 Kosta Bajić at Footballdatabase

1989 births
Living people
Footballers from Novi Sad
Association football forwards
Serbian footballers
FK ČSK Čelarevo players
FK Radnički Nova Pazova players
FK Jedinstvo Užice players
FK Jagodina players
Besëlidhja Lezhë players
Serbian SuperLiga players
Kategoria e Parë players
Serbian expatriate footballers
Serbian expatriate sportspeople in Albania